The 2020–21 season was the 123rd season in the existence of Juventus and the club's 14th consecutive season in the top flight of Italian football. In addition to the domestic league, Juventus participated in this season's editions of the Coppa Italia, the Supercoppa Italiana, and the UEFA Champions League. The season covered the period from 1 September 2020 to 30 June 2021. On 25 November 2021, an eight-episode docu-series called All or Nothing: Juventus, which followed the club throughout the season, by spending time with the players behind the scenes both on and off the field, was released on Amazon Prime.

Players

Squad information
Players and squad numbers last updated on 2 May 2021. Appearances include league matches only.Note: Flags indicate national team as has been defined under FIFA eligibility rules. Players may hold more than one non-FIFA nationality.

a. Additional costs of €12 million to be paid.

Transfers

Summer 2020

In

Out

Other acquisitions

Other disposals

Winter 2020–21

In

Out

Other acquisitions

Other disposals

End of season

Other acquisitions

Other disposals

Pre-season and friendlies

Competitions

Overview

Serie A

League table

Results summary

Results by round

Matches
The league fixtures were announced on 2 September 2020.

Coppa Italia

Supercoppa Italiana

UEFA Champions League

Group stage

The draw for the group stage was held on 1 October 2020.

Knockout phase

Round of 16
The draw for the round of 16 was held on 14 December 2020.

Statistics

Appearances and goals

|-
! colspan=14 style=background:#DCDCDC; text-align:center| Goalkeepers

|-
! colspan=14 style=background:#DCDCDC; text-align:center| Defenders

|-
! colspan=14 style=background:#DCDCDC; text-align:center| Midfielders

|-
! colspan=14 style=background:#DCDCDC; text-align:center| Forwards

|-
! colspan="18" style="background:#dcdcdc; text-align:center"| Players transferred/loaned out during the season

Goalscorers

Notes

See also
 2020–21 Juventus F.C. Under-23 season
 2020–21 Juventus F.C. (women) season

References

External links

Juventus F.C. seasons
Juventus
Juventus